Ιn Greek mythology, Antiope (Ancient Greek: Ἀντιόπη derived from αντι anti "against, compared to, like" and οψ ops "voice" or means "confronting") was the daughter of Pylon or Pylaon. She was married to Eurytus, by whom she became the mother of the Argonauts Iphitus and Clytius, also of Toxeus, Deioneus, Molion, Didaeon and a very beautiful daughter, Iole. She is also called Antioche.

Notes

References 

 Apollonius Rhodius, Argonautica translated by Robert Cooper Seaton (1853-1915), R. C. Loeb Classical Library Volume 001. London, William Heinemann Ltd, 1912. Online version at the Topos Text Project.
 Apollonius Rhodius, Argonautica. George W. Mooney. London. Longmans, Green. 1912. Greek text available at the Perseus Digital Library.
 Gaius Julius Hyginus, Fabulae from The Myths of Hyginus translated and edited by Mary Grant. University of Kansas Publications in Humanistic Studies. Online version at the Topos Text Project.
 Graves, Robert, The Greek Myths, Harmondsworth, London, England, Penguin Books, 1960. 
 Graves, Robert, The Greek Myths: The Complete and Definitive Edition. Penguin Books Limited. 2017. 

Women in Greek mythology

Characters in Greek mythology